Keinosuke (written: 慶之輔 or 啓之助) is a masculine Japanese given name. Notable people with the name include:

, Japanese karateka
, Japanese diplomat

Japanese masculine given names